Paul Jones (born February 10, 1963) is a former American mixed martial artist.

Career
He began his fighting career in Extreme Fighting. His first match against Erik Paulson resulted in a draw. Jones immediately went into USWF (Unified Shoot Wrestling Federation) after his draw and won by submission. Jones then tried Shooto, which is located in Tokyo, where he won two matches by decision. Jones went back into USWF and won seven more matches resulting in nine consecutive wins. He finally made it into the Ultimate Fighting Championship and won his match with Flavio Luiz Moura via rear naked choke submission. He was on a roll fighting in mixed martial arts until his next match came up against Chuck Liddell, a legend rising in UFC. Jones gave everything he had, but Chuck Liddell won by TKO (technical knock out). Jones went back into USWF and fought his last match against Junior Baeza and won via keylock submission.

Post career
Jones retired from his fighting career after his match with Baeza and he is now coaching wrestling, cross country, and football at Boys Ranch Texas High School. He has helped many teenagers participate in state wrestling with his coaching abilities. Jones lives in Boys Ranch, Texas with his wife and three daughters.

Mixed martial arts record

|-
| Win
| align=center| 11–1–1
| Junior Baeza
| Submission (keylock)
| USWF 18: Unified Shoot Wrestling Federation 18
| 
| align=center| 1
| align=center| 2:00
| Amarillo, Texas, United States
| 
|-
| Loss
| align=center| 10–1–1
| Chuck Liddell
| TKO (cut)
| UFC 22
| 
| align=center| 1
| align=center| 3:53
| Lake Charles, Louisiana, United States
| 
|-
| Win
| align=center| 10–0–1
| Flavio Luiz Moura
| Submission (rear-naked choke)
| UFC 21
| 
| align=center| 1
| align=center| 4:20
| Cedar Rapids, Iowa, United States
| 
|-
| Win
| align=center| 9–0–1
| Larry Parker
| TKO (submission to strikes)
| USWF 16: Unified Shoot Wrestling Federation 16
| 
| align=center| 1
| align=center| 11:37
| Amarillo, Texas, United States
| 
|-
| Win
| align=center| 8–0–1
| Sanae Kikuta
| Decision (unanimous)
| Shooto: Las Grandes Viajes 6
| 
| align=center| 3
| align=center| 5:00
| Tokyo, Japan
| 
|-
| Win
| align=center| 7–0–1
| Bill Scott
| Disqualification (rope grabbing)
| USWF 12: Unified Shoot Wrestling Federation 12
| 
| align=center| 2
| align=center| 1:03
| Amarillo, Texas, United States
| 
|-
| Win
| align=center| 6–0–1
| Wayne Admire
| Submission (armbar)
| USWF 11: Unified Shoot Wrestling Federation 11
| 
| align=center| 1
| align=center| 3:14
| Amarillo, Texas, United States
| 
|-
| Win
| align=center| 5–0–1
| David Davis
| Submission (rear-naked choke)
| USWF 10: Unified Shoot Wrestling Federation 10
| 
| align=center| 1
| align=center| 2:50
| Odessa, Texas, United States
| 
|-
| Win
| align=center| 4–0–1
| Juan Mott
| Disqualification
| USWF 9: Unified Shoot Wrestling Federation 9
| 
| align=center| 1
| align=center| 8:00
| Texas, United States
| 
|-
| Win
| align=center| 3–0–1
| Tony Castillo
| Submission (rear-naked choke)
| USWF 7: Unified Shoot Wrestling Federation 7
| 
| align=center| 1
| align=center| 12:17
| Texas, United States
| 
|-
| Win
| align=center| 2–0–1
| Erik Paulson
| Decision (majority)
| Shooto: Reconquista 3
| 
| align=center| 3
| align=center| 5:00
| Tokyo, Japan
| 
|-
| Win
| align=center| 1–0–1
| Tony Castillo
| Submission (choke)
| USWF 6: Unified Shoot Wrestling Federation 6
| 
| align=center| 1
| align=center| 7:12
| Amarillo, Texas, United States
| 
|-
| Draw
| align=center| 0–0–1
| Erik Paulson
| Draw
| EF 4: Extreme Fighting 4
| 
| align=center| 3
| align=center| 5:00
| Des Moines, Iowa, United States
|

Notes

References
http://www.topgunmma.com/viewFighter.php?fighterid=120 September 16, 2009
http://www.topgunmma.com/viewVideo.php?videoid=412 September 16, 2009
http://www.maxpreps.com/high-schools/HhkuKaoERU6II9X0qqaOYw/boys-ranch-roughriders/home.htm September 16, 2009
http://www.amarillo.com/stories/100208/spe_11283525.shtml September 16, 2009

External links
 
 

American male mixed martial artists
Living people
1963 births
Ultimate Fighting Championship male fighters